Doctor of Biblical Studies (abbreviated DBS or DB) or Doctor of Sacred Scripture (abbreviated SSD, from Latin Sacrae Scripturae Doctor) is a doctoral-level advanced professional degree in applied theology for practitioners seeking to increase knowledge and understanding of biblical and theological principles for their professional ministry. Academic as well as ecclesiastical doctoral programs exist that lead the students to the degree of Doctor of Biblical Studies.

Ecclesiastical studies 
The doctoral degree is offered by various of the Pontifical universities. Also churches offer doctoral study programs which focus is, mainly, the preparation of biblical scholars and teachers for their service to their individual church, may it be as teachers in seminaries and divinity schools as well as in colleges, or as pastors of local congregations. These study program are more practically oriented and controlled by faith congregations.

References

Biblical Studies
Religious degrees